Kierin Meehan (born in Brisbane, Queensland) is an Australian children's book author, teacher and choreographer.

Life
Meehan studied at the University of Queensland, where she received a degree in German and Japanese.  She later obtained a graduate degree in performing arts (dance) from the Queensland University of Technology, and worked as a dance teacher and choreographer for ten years. Meehan also taught German and Japanese language lessons, and lived in Japan for one year.

Writing career
Meehan began writing in Esashi, a town on the west coast of Hokkaidō, Japan, when she was asked to write a monthly column for the town's magazine. To date, she has written three books: Hannah's Winter (2001), Night Singing (2003) and In the Monkey Forest (2005).  Hannah's Winter was a notable book in the 2002 CBC Awards, and Night Singing and In the Monkey Forest both received the Patricia Wrightson Prize. Meehan also wrote a fourth novel, Ten Rules for Detectives.

References

Year of birth missing (living people)
Living people
Australian children's writers
Australian expatriates in Japan
People from Brisbane
University of Queensland alumni
Australian choreographers
Queensland University of Technology alumni